Kamariku is a village in Väike-Maarja Parish, Lääne-Viru County, in northeastern Estonia. Prior to the administrative reform of Estonian local governments in 2017, the village was part of Rakke Parish.

References

Villages in Lääne-Viru County